Cub Run is an unincorporated community in Hart County, Kentucky, United States. It was also known as The Crossroads.

There are several anecdotal explanations for how the place received its name; some involve stories of a bear cub running.  In fact in southeastern jargon a "run" is a creek (e.g. "Battle of Bull Run"), and Cub Run is a creek which is a tributary of the Green River on the northern edge of Mammoth Cave National Park, and has its origin in the village of Cub Run.  The species of cub is lost in history but very likely a bear cub given the proximity of other creeks such as Bear Creek and Bar Brook.

The indie rock band Eleventh Dream Day recorded their 1991 album Lived to Tell in a tobacco barn on the Niland's farm in Cub Run.

References

Unincorporated communities in Hart County, Kentucky
Unincorporated communities in Kentucky